Sirani may refer to:

 Anna Maria Sirani (1645–1715), Italian painter, sister of Elisabetta Sirani
 Elisabetta Sirani (1638–1665), Italian painter
 Giovanni Andrea Sirani (1610–1670), Italian painter, father of Anna Maria and Elisabetta
 Cerani (mountain) or Serani, an Andean mountain in Peru
 Acrobasis sirani, a species of snout moth in the genus Acrobasis
 Sirani, Pakistan, a village in Sindh, Pakistan